Savina is a rural locality (a village) in Cherdynsky District, Perm Krai, Russia. The population was 48 as of 2010. There is 1 street.

Geography 
Savina is located 22 km northwest of Cherdyn (the district's administrative centre) by road. Anisimovo is the nearest rural locality.

References 

Rural localities in Cherdynsky District